Pooch Perfect is a dog grooming reality competition television program created by Seven Studios UK (now Beyond Productions UK) and first broadcast on the Seven Network in Australia. The program is hosted by Rebel Wilson, and began airing on 27 February 2020. The series features ten professional dog stylists competing in a series of themed challenges which sees the transformation of beloved pets, with a judging panel including international styling experts Amber Lewin and Colin Taylor determining the winner of $100,000 in prize money. The title is a play-on-words of the film Pitch Perfect, in which Wilson starred.

Despite the high profile of host Wilson and significant promotion by Seven prior to broadcast, the show struggled in the ratings, and the series was absent at Seven's upfronts for 2021. Despite this, local adaptations of the show aired in the United Kingdom and the United States in 2021, with Wilson reprising her role as host for the latter version.

Contestants 
Davina Dewar
Natasha Fox
Brad Broadway
Prue Hammond
Monique Finch
Annie
Alicia
Sue Wright
Lee Wright

Episodes

International adaptations

The format was sold in February 2020 to the BBC. The UK series is hosted by Sheridan Smith and filmed at dock10 studios. Beyond Productions UK produced the series with Damon Pattison and Susanne Rock as executive producer. It was cancelled after one season.

ABC announced a US version of the series in January 2021 with Wilson as host and Lisa Vanderpump, Jorge Bendersky and Callie Harris as judges. An eight-episode run was ordered, which premiered on 30 March 2021. It ended on May 18, 2021, and was canceled on January 20, 2022.

See also
Celebrity Dog School

Notes
This episode aired on 7TWO in Victoria and South Australia due to coverage of the AFL.

References

External links
 Official Website

2020 Australian television series debuts
2020 Australian television series endings
Seven Network original programming
Television series by Beyond Television Productions
English-language television shows
2020s Australian reality television series
Television shows about dogs